Local elections to Northumberland County Council, a county council in the north east of England, were held on 1 May 1997, resulting in a council with Labour members forming a majority.

Results

References

External links
Northumberland County Council

1997
1997 English local elections
20th century in Northumberland